Claudia Bär (9 April 1980 – 28 September 2015) was a German slalom canoeist who competed at the international level from 1995 to 2013.

She won five medals in the K1 team event at the ICF Canoe Slalom World Championships with two silvers (2003, 2013) and three bronzes (2006, 2009, 2011). She also won two golds and one silver at the European Championships.

Bär was diagnosed with leukemia in 2013 and eventually succumbed to the illness in 2015. She dated slalom canoeist Sideris Tasiadis until her death.

References

12 September 2009 results of the women's K-1 team finals at the 2009 ICF Canoe Slalom World Championships. – accessed 12 September 2009.

German female canoeists
1980 births
2015 deaths
Medalists at the ICF Canoe Slalom World Championships